KJWY-LD (digital channel 21) is a low-power television station licensed to Salem, Oregon, United States and serving the Portland metropolitan area, Oregon as an affiliate of the Spanish-language Telemundo network. The station is owned by Augusta, Georgia–based SagamoreHill Broadcasting.

KJWY-LP was originally owned by Northwest Christian Broadcasting and broadcast Christian related programming on a full time basis. Their website stated that they were "the first Christian TV station in Oregon".

In 2018 KJWY-LD was sold to SagamoreHill Broadcasting. A construction permit was filed and the tower was moved about 1 mile north to Bald Hill. 

The station broadcasts Spanish programming with Telemundo and TeleXtos on two of their channels.  Channel 21.3 Salem and Channel 29.3 Portland began broadcasting MeTV on September 1, 2022.

KJWY-LD operates on digital channel 36.  

KJWY-LD has a repeater,  channel 29, in Portland, Oregon. KJYY-LD, which (as K26GJ) formerly operated in analog, had been digital-only since September 2, 2009. On March 14, 2022, SagamoreHill Broadcasting requested permission to change KJYY-LD's virtual channel from 26 to 29, to match the station's physical channel.

Digital channels

The station's digital signal is multiplexed:

Translator

References

External links
Roseland Broadcasting
NWCB Homepage Archived

Television stations in Oregon
Mass media in Salem, Oregon
Television channels and stations established in 1981
1981 establishments in Oregon
Defunct television stations in the United States
Television channels and stations disestablished in 2015
2015 disestablishments in Oregon